{{Infobox given name
| name = Filipa
|image=
|imagesize=
|caption=
| pronunciation =FIL-i-pa
| gender =Female
| meaning ="Friend of horses"
| region = Portugal, Brazil, Croatia, Poland Serbia
| origin = Greek 
| related names = Philippa, Filippa
| footnotes = 
}}
Filipa is a given name meaning "friend of horses". Common alternative spellings include Philippa, Phillippa, Filippa, or Filipa. It is the feminine form of the masculine name Philip'' in Serbian, Portuguese, Croatian, Czech and Polish. It is a noble name in Portugal and a rare name in Brazil. 

Notable people with the name Filipa include:

Filipa Moniz Perestrelo, Portuguese noblewoman
Filipa de Lencastre, English princess, consort queen of Portugal
Filipa of Coimbra, Portuguese royal, granddaughter of Filipa de Lencastre
Filipa Azevedo, Portuguese singer
Filipa Carmo da Silva, South African singer 
Filipa César, Portuguese film director
Filipa Sousa, Portuguese singer

See also
Philippa

References

Portuguese feminine given names